The Fame is the debut studio album by American singer Lady Gaga. It was released on August 19, 2008, by Interscope Records. After joining KonLive Distribution and Cherrytree Records in 2008, Gaga began working on the album with different producers, primarily RedOne, Martin Kierszenbaum, and Rob Fusari. Musically, The Fame is an electropop, synth-pop, and dance-pop record that displays influences from 1980s music. Lyrically, it visualizes Gaga's love of fame in general, while also dealing with subjects such as love, sex, money, drugs, and sexual identity. The album was primarily promoted through The Fame Ball Tour and multiple television appearances, and was reissued as a deluxe edition with The Fame Monster on November 18, 2009.

The album received generally favorable reviews from critics, who commended its lyrical content, Gaga's musicianship and vocal ability. It was a commercial success, topping the charts in several countries including the United Kingdom, Canada, Germany, Ireland, Poland, and Switzerland. It peaked at number two on the US Billboard 200, and also topped the Dance/Electronic Albums chart for 175 non-consecutive weeks, the most time on top in history. It has since been certified six-times Platinum by the Recording Industry Association of America (RIAA). The Fame became the fifth best-selling album of 2009, and has sold over 4.9 million copies in the United States as of January 2019. Combined with The Fame Monster, the album had sold over 18 million copies worldwide as of August 2019.

The first two singles off the album,  "Just Dance" and "Poker Face" gained international success, topping the charts in several countries worldwide including the United States, the United Kingdom, and Australia. The subsequent singles "LoveGame" and "Paparazzi" were commercial successes as well, charting within the top-ten of over ten countries worldwide. "Eh, Eh (Nothing Else I Can Say)" had a limited single release, while "Beautiful, Dirty, Rich" served as a promotional single.

The Fame has won multiple awards since its release. The album was nominated for a total of five Grammy Awards at the 52nd Annual Grammy Awards, including Album of the Year. It won Best Electronic/Dance Album and Best Dance Recording for its single "Poker Face", and also won Best International Album at the 2010 Brit Awards. In 2013 and 2022, Rolling Stone named The Fame as one of the "100 Greatest Debut Albums of All-Time". As of 2023, it is the 12th biggest album of all time on the US Billboard 200.

Background and development 
While establishing herself as an artist and working her way up through the New York underground club scene, Lady Gaga released her debut studio album, The Fame. Speaking about the title and concept of the album, Gaga explained: "The Fame is about how anyone can feel famous. ... Pop culture is art. It doesn't make you cool to hate pop culture, so I embraced it and you hear it all over The Fame. But, it's a sharable fame. I want to invite you all to the party. I want people to feel a part of this lifestyle." Gaga stated in an interview with MTV UK that she had been working on the album for two and a half years and completed half of it during the first week of January 2008. As well as writing the lyrics, Gaga worked on the melodies and synth work of the album, with record producer RedOne. According to Gaga, the first track "Just Dance" is a joyous, heart-themed song, which appeals to people going through tough times in their life. "LoveGame", the second track, was inspired by Gaga's sexual crush on a stranger in a night club to whom she said, "I wanna ride on your disco stick". It was written in four minutes based on the disco stick hook. "Paparazzi" has been interpreted with different meanings. However Gaga explained in an interview with About.com, that the song was inspired by her struggles and hunger for fame and love. Essentially a love song, "Paparazzi" dealt with enticing the media and asked the question, whether one can have both fame and love.

"Poker Face" was inspired by Gaga's boyfriends who enjoyed gambling, and also dealt with her personal experience of bisexuality; her fantasies about women while having sex with men, thus representing her 'poker face'." "Boys Boys Boys" was inspired by the similarly titled Mötley Crüe song "Girls, Girls, Girls". Gaga explained that she wanted a female version of the song that rockers would like too. "Beautiful, Dirty, Rich" summed up her time of self-discovery, living in the Lower East Side and dabbling in drugs and the party scene. "Eh, Eh (Nothing Else I Can Say)" was about breaking up with a boyfriend and finding someone new. "Brown Eyes" was inspired by the British rock band Queen and, according to Gaga, is the most vulnerable song on the album.

Gaga further clarified the ideas behind The Fame, and her inspirations and visions for the album. She believed that the most important thing missing from contemporary pop music was the combination of the visual imagery of the artist with the music. Gaga incorporated theatrics in her live performances of the songs from the album. Hence she hoped that people would take notice of the performance art, which she was trying to bring back with the album and its music; according to her, the music put the lifestyle in front of it.
"I just feel like this record is really different- you[']ve got club bangers to more 70s glam to more singer-songwriter records to rock music. ... The Fame is not about who you are—it's about how everybody wants to know who you are! Buy it and listen to it before you go out or in the car. ... I think you've really got to allow artists' creativity to marinate. It took me a while but really delving into myself I finally got it. I couldn't be more proud of it. It's not just a record[,] it's a whole pop art movement[.] It's not just about one song."

Composition 

Musically, the album combines electropop, synth-pop, and dance-pop, while drawing influences from 1980s music. Songs like "Poker Face", "Just Dance" and "LoveGame" are uptempo dance songs, with "Poker Face" carrying a dark sound with clear vocals on the chorus and a pop hook. "Just Dance" is synth-based while "LoveGame" has a more dance-oriented beat, and "Money Honey" has a moderate techno groove. All of them combined synths of clipped marching beats, sawing electronics and contained mild R&B-infused beats. "Paparazzi" carried a sultry beat while "Summerboy" had influences of the music of Blondie. "Eh, Eh (Nothing Else I Can Say)" is credited as a ballad compared to the rest of the dance-fueled tracks from The Fame. The song has a 1980s synth-pop feel to it, while incorporating the "Eh, Eh" hook from Rihanna's single "Umbrella" (2007).

Lyrically, the songs on The Fame talk about being famous and achieving popularity; "Poker Face" is about sexual innuendo and teasing. Gaga explained to the Daily Star that the lyrics carry a bit of an undertone of confusion about love and sex. According to the BBC, the "Mum-mum-mum-mah" hook used in the song is sampled from Boney M.'s 1977 hit "Ma Baker". "Just Dance" talks about being intoxicated in a party, with lyrics like "What's going on on the floor? / I love this record, baby but I can't see straight anymore". "LoveGame" portrays a message about love, fame and sexuality. "Paparazzi" portrays a stalker who is following somebody being their biggest fan. The lyrics also portray the desire of capturing the attention of the camera as well as achieving fame. Gaga explained that,
"This idea of The Fame runs through and through. Basically, if you have nothing—no money, no fame—you can still feel beautiful and dirty rich. It's about making choices, and having references—things you pull from your life that you believe in. It's about self-discovery and being creative. The record is slightly focused, but it's also eclectic. ... The music is intended to inspire people to feel a certain way about themselves, so they'll be able to encompass, in their own lives, a sense of inner fame that they can project to the world, and the carefree nature of the album is a reflection of that aura. I like to funnel interesting ideas to the rest of the world through a pop lens."

Promotion

Singles 

"Just Dance" was released as the album's lead single commercially worldwide on June 17, 2008, through digital distribution. The song was critically acclaimed with reviewers complimenting its club anthem-like nature and the synth-pop associated with it. It achieved commercial success by topping charts in the United States, Australia, Canada, the Republic of Ireland, the Netherlands and the United Kingdom, as well as reaching the top 10 in 16 other countries. The song received a Grammy nomination in the Best Dance Recording category but lost to electronic duo Daft Punk for their song "Harder, Better, Faster, Stronger".

"Poker Face" was released as the second single from the album. It was also well received by critics, most of whom have praised the robotic hook and the chorus. The single achieved greater success than "Just Dance" by topping the charts in almost all the countries it was released to. "Poker Face" became Gaga's second consecutive number one on the Hot 100. On December 2, 2009, "Poker Face" received three Grammy nominations in the categories of Song of the Year, Record of the Year, and won for Best Dance Recording.

"Eh, Eh (Nothing Else I Can Say)" was the album's third single in Australia, New Zealand, Sweden and Denmark and fourth in France. The song received mixed reviews. Some critics compared it to nineties Europop while the others criticized it for bringing the party-like nature of the album to a halt. It failed to match the success of the previous singles in Australia and New Zealand by reaching 15 and nine, respectively. It peaked at two in Sweden and at seven in France.

"LoveGame" was released as the third single in the United States, Canada and some European nations. It was the fourth single in Australia, New Zealand, and the United Kingdom. The song was critically appreciated for its catchy tune and the "I wanna take a ride on your disco stick" hook. The song has reached the top 10 in countries such as the United States, Australia and Canada and the top 20 in others.

"Paparazzi" was announced as the third single in the United Kingdom and Ireland with a release date of July 6, 2009, the fourth single in the United States, and the fifth single overall. The song has reached the top five in Australia, Canada, Ireland and the United Kingdom. It also reached the top 10 in the United States. The song has received critical acclaim for its fun-filled, club-friendly nature and is deemed the most memorable and telling song from the album. The associated music video for the song was shot as a mini-movie with Gaga starring as a doomed starlet who is almost killed by her boyfriend, but in the end takes her revenge and reclaims her fame and popularity.

Live performances and media appearances 
To promote the album, Gaga did several performances worldwide. Her first televised appearance was on Logo's NewNowNext Awards on June 7, 2008. She also performed on Michalsky StyleNite at Berlin Fashion Week, So You Think You Can Dance, Jimmy Kimmel Live!, The Tonight Show with Jay Leno, as well as in Vietnam for the 57th Miss Universe beauty pageant during the swimsuit competition. On January 31, 2009, she performed on television in Ireland on RTÉ One's show Tubridy Tonight. Three songs from The Fame were used in the second season of The CW's series Gossip Girl: "Paparazzi" in the episode "Summer, Kind of Wonderful", "Poker Face" in "The Serena Also Rises", and "Money Honey" in "Remains of the J". Gaga also performed "Poker Face" on American Idol on April 1, 2009. At the 2009 MTV Video Music Awards, the singer performed "Paparazzi". Her gig involved choreographed dance moves, playing on the piano, theatrical blood dripping from her ribcage, and ended with the singer hung lifeless with one hand rising above her dancers and blood smeared on her face. It is widely considered to be one of Gaga's greatest performances to date, and according to Billboard Ashley Laderer, "this was the performance that really made Lady Gaga. It proved she was more than just a superficial pop star—she was an artist".

To celebrate the launch of the show Dirty Sexy Money, ABC created a music video of Gaga's song "Beautiful, Dirty, Rich", directed by Melina Matsoukas. It was initially announced as Gaga's second single, but "Poker Face" was chosen instead, with "Beautiful, Dirty, Rich" being released as a promotional single. There were two videos released for the song – the first was composed of clips from Dirty Sexy Money, and the second was the actual music video. The song charted on the UK Singles Chart due to digital downloads and peaked at number 83.

Tour 

The album received further promotion from her first headlining concert tour, The Fame Ball Tour, which started on March 12, 2009, in San Diego, California. It was Gaga's first concert tour with North American shows in March, followed by dates in Oceania and a solo trek through Europe. Dates in Asia soon followed, as well as two performances at England's V Festival and two shows in North America that had been postponed from April. Gaga described the tour as a traveling museum show incorporating artist Andy Warhol's pop-performance art concept. Tickets were distributed for charity also. Alternate versions of the show with minimal variations were planned by Gaga to accommodate different venues.

The show consisted of four segments, with each segment being followed by a video interlude to the next segment, and it ended with an encore. The set list consisted of songs from The Fame only. Gaga appeared on the stage in new costumes including an innovative dress made entirely of plastic bubbles and premiered an unreleased song called "Future Love". An alternate set list with minor changes was performed for European dates. The show received positive critical appreciation with critics complimenting Gaga's vocal clarity and fashion sense as well as her ability to pull off theatrics like a professional artist.

Critical reception 

The Fame received generally positive reviews from music critics. At Metacritic, which assigns a normalized rating out of 100 to reviews from mainstream critics, the album received an average score of 71, based on 13 reviews. AllMusic editor Stephen Thomas Erlewine called the album "music that sounds thickly sexy with its stainless steel synths and dark disco rhythms", and wrote that it is "glorious pop trash and a wicked parody of it." Nicole Powers of URB complimented its "irony-laden lyrics, delivered in a style that owes a little something to Gwen Stefani," as well as the album's "deluxe ditties". Mikael Wood of Entertainment Weekly called it "remarkably (and exhaustingly) pure in its vision of a world in which nothing trumps being beautiful, dirty, and rich. In this economy, though, her high-times escapism has its charms".

Alexis Petridis of The Guardian found it "packing an immensely addictive melody or an inescapable hook, virtually everything sounds like another hit single", and predicted that it "certainly sounds like it could be big." Daniel Brockman from The Boston Phoenix wrote that "Gaga ups the ante in terms of catchy songwriting and sheer high-in-the-club-banging-to-the-beat abandon." Ben Hogwood of musicOMH praised Gaga's "blend of sassy attitude, metallic beats and sharp, incisive songwriting", elements which he felt are integral to "creating pop music".

Although he panned "Eh, Eh (Nothing Else I Can Say)", "Paper Gangsta", and "Brown Eyes", Evan Sawdey of PopMatters called The Fame "a solid dance album" and wrote that "much of the album's success can be attributed to rising club producer RedOne." Joey Guerra from the Houston Chronicle felt that although the songs present in the album are not innovative, Gaga deserved credit for bringing real dance music to the mass. Genevieve Koski of The A.V. Club felt that the "whole point" of the album is "glitter-laced, dance-inciting energy that bodes well for extended club play". Slant Magazines Sal Cinquemani viewed that Gaga's lyrics veer between "cheap" and "nonsensical drivel", while her singing is "uneven at best". He added that the highlights such as "Poker Face", "Starstruck", "Paper Gangsta", and "Summerboy" rely "almost solely on their snappy production and sing-along hooks."

Freedom du Lac from The Washington Post criticized the album for lacking originality. MSN Musics Robert Christgau gave the album an "honorable mention" and quippedly referred to it as "shallowness at its most principled." The Fame garnered five Grammy nominations at the 52nd Annual Grammy Awards on December 2, 2009. The album itself was nominated for Album of the Year and won Best Electronic/Dance Album. It also won Best International Album at the 2010 Brit Awards. In 2013 and 2022, Rolling Stone named The Fame as one of the "100 Greatest Debut Albums of All-Time".

Commercial performance 

In the United States, The Fame debuted at number 17 on the Billboard 200 with sales of 24,000 on the issue dated November 15, 2008. After fluctuating down the charts, the album reached number 10 on the issue dated March 7, 2009. The album also topped Billboards Dance/Electronic Albums chart; it has stayed at the number-one spot for 175 non-consecutive weeks, as of week of November 5, 2022, and holds the record for the most time on top in the chart's history. In March 2020, the album was certified six-times Platinum for shipments of six million copies, by the Recording Industry Association of America (RIAA). With the release of The Fame Monster, which was also combined with The Fame as a deluxe edition, the album jumped from 34 to 6 on the Billboard 200 with sales of 151,000. It reached its highest sales week on the issue dated January 9, 2010 with 169,000 copies sold. On the issue dated January 16, 2010, The Fame moved to a new peak of two on the Billboard 200 after being on the charts for 62 weeks. By the end of 2009, The Fame became the fifth best-selling album of the year.

The Fame has sold 4.9 million copies in the United States as of March 2019 and is the seventh best-selling digital album, selling 1.086 million digital copies. Including equivalent album units, The Fame has sold 8.8 million in the country. It was ranked at number 12 on the Billboard Top 200 Albums of All Time list. Following Gaga's Super Bowl LI halftime show performance, The Fame re-entered the Billboard 200 at number 6, selling 17,000 copies and 38,000 total album-equivalent units. It has spent over 300 weeks on the chart.

In Canada, the album reached number-one, and has been certified seven times platinum by Music Canada for shipment of 560,000 copies. It had sold 476,000 copies as of March 2011. The album debuted at number six, and peaked at number two in New Zealand as well as being certified double platinum. In Australia, the album debuted at number 12 and peaked at number three. The album has been certified sextuple platinum in Australia, by the Australian Recording Industry Association (ARIA) for shipments of 420,000 copies.

The Fame debuted in the United Kingdom at number three with first week sales of 25,228 copies. After spending 10 weeks in the top 10, it replaced Ronan Keating's Songs for My Mother at the top position. Since then, the album spent four consecutive weeks at the number-one spot. It has since been certified ten-times platinum by the British Phonographic Industry (BPI), and has sold 3 million copies as of October 2018. It also became the first album to reach the platinum certification based on digital sales after selling 300,000 units in the UK. The album is the ninth best-selling album in the UK of the 21st century, and the 31st best-selling album in UK chart history.

In France, The Fame debuted at number 73 and peaked at number two for five weeks. It has been certified diamond status by the Syndicat National de l'Édition Phonographique (SNEP) and, as of February 2012, has sold 630,000 copies. In Ireland, the album entered the charts at number-eight, and in its fifth week climbed to number-one for two consecutive weeks. In mainland Europe, the album peaked at number one on the European Top 100 Albums, the Austrian Albums Chart and the German Album Chart. In Germany, it became the fourth most downloaded album ever. It also reached the top 20 in Mexico, Belgium, the Czech Republic, Denmark, Finland, Greece, Hungary, Italy, the Netherlands, Norway, Poland, Russia, and Switzerland. Combined with its reissue, The Fame Monster, the album has sold over 18 million copies worldwide.

Legacy and impact 
With the release of The Fame, Gaga was credited for reviving electronic dance music during the late 2000s on radio. Jonathan Bogart from The Atlantic stated, "EDM came in by no back door but right through the front gate, with Lady Gaga's 'Just Dance' in 2008" and that "the sound didn't take long to spread". DJ Tommie Sunshine told MTV that "there wouldn't be a David Guetta top 10 hit... there wouldn't be this Black Eyed Peas record, if it wasn't for The Fame. The influence of that record is epic, and we are hearing talking about all of this because of that." St. Louis Post-Dispatch journalist Kevin C. Johnson with his article "Lady Gaga helps bring EDM to the masses", acknowledges the impact. In the article, Rob Lemon said Gaga "definitely has had influence" and that she "is exposing people to the music, and anybody exposing people to it is part of the machine." Radio personality Zane Lowe and record producer/DJ Calvin Harris, addressed the impact of the album in a Beats 1 radio interview. Lowe stated: "Mike Skinner told me this, cause we were having a debate about Lady Gaga and he was like 'One thing you gotta remember about Lady Gaga, she put four-on-the-floor back on American radio'" and that "up until that moment there was nothing resembling four-on-the-floor in pop music." Harris added: "A 100%. They even had a hip-hop version of 'Poker Face', for radio" and that "it was the 4/4 one that hit, and then it just went ridiculous." In 2020, Stephen Daw from Billboard stated that "The Fame not only changed the course of Gaga's career, but corrected the course of modern pop music for generations to come.

The Fame Monster 

The Fame Monster is a reissue of The Fame, released on November 18, 2009. Initially planned solely as a part of the deluxe edition of The Fame, Interscope later decided to release the eight new songs as a standalone EP in select territories. The decision was also due to Gaga believing the re-release was too expensive and that the albums were conceptually different, describing them as yin and yang. The deluxe edition of the album contains The Fame in its entirety along with The Fame Monster. The album deals with the darker side of fame, as experienced by Gaga over the course of 2008–09 while travelling around the world, and are expressed through a monster metaphor. Cover artwork was done by Hedi Slimane and has a gothic look which Gaga had to convince her record company to allow her to shoot. The composition takes its inspiration from Gothic music and fashion shows. Contemporary critics gave mostly positive reviews of the album, with the majority of them complimenting the songs "Bad Romance", "Telephone", "Dance in the Dark", and "Monster". In some countries the album charted together with The Fame while in others like the United States, Canada and Japan, it charted as a separate album. It has reached top 10 in most of the major markets. She announced The Monster Ball Tour supporting the album, which started on November 27, 2009, in Montreal, Canada, and finished on May 6, 2011, in Mexico City, Mexico.

Track listing 

Notes
  signifies an additional co-producer
  signifies an additional co-producer and remixer

Personnel 
Personnel adapted from The Fame liner notes.

 Akon – background vocals
 Victor Bailey – bass guitar
 Vicki Boyd – A&R coordinator
 Troy Carter – management
 Lisa Einhorn-Gilder – production coordinator
 Flo Rida – rapping
 Rob Fusari – production, co-executive producer
 Calvin "Sci-Fidelty" Gaines – programming, bass guitar
 Gene Grimaldi – mastering
 Vincent Herbert – executive producer, A&R
 Pieter Henket – photography
 Tom Kafafian – guitar
 Dyana Kass – marketing director
 Martin Kierszenbaum – production, A&R
 Brian Kierulf – production, arrangement
 Lady Gaga – lead and background vocals, production, piano, synthesizers, keys
 Leah Landon – management
 Candice Lawler – photography
 Dave Murga – drums
 Colby O'Donis – vocals, background vocals
 Robert Orton – mixing
 Jennifer Paola – A&R admin
 RedOne – production, instruments, programming, recording, background vocals, co-executive producer
 Andrea Ruffalo – A&R coordinator
 Dave Russell – engineering
 Warwick Saint – photography
 Joshua M. Schwartz – production, arrangement
 Space Cowboy – production, vocals
 Joe Tomino – drums
 Tony Ugval – engineering
 Liam Ward – design

Charts

Weekly charts

Decade-end charts

All-time charts

Year-end charts

Certifications and sales

Release history

Notes

See also 

 List of best-selling albums by women
 List of best-selling albums in Austria
 List of best-selling albums in the Philippines
 List of best-selling albums in the United Kingdom
 List of UK Albums Chart number ones of the 2000s
 List of UK Albums Chart number ones of the 2010s
 List of European number-one hits of 2009
 List of European number-one hits of 2010
 List of number-one albums of 2009 (Canada)
 List of number-one albums of 2009 (Ireland)
 List of number-one albums of 2010 (Ireland)
 List of number-one albums of 2011 (Poland)
 List of Billboard number-one electronic albums of 2008
 List of Billboard number-one electronic albums of 2009
 List of Billboard number-one electronic albums of 2010
 List of Billboard number-one electronic albums of 2011
 List of Billboard number-one electronic albums of 2017
 List of Billboard number-one electronic albums of 2018
 List of Billboard number-one electronic albums of 2020
 List of Billboard number-one electronic albums of 2021
 List of Billboard number-one electronic albums of 2022
 List of number-one hits of 2009 (Austria)
 List of number-one hits of 2010 (Germany)
 List of number-one hits of 2010 (Switzerland)

References

External links 
 The Fame – Ten Years  at LadyGaga.com

2008 debut albums
Lady Gaga albums
Albums produced by Fernando Garibay
Albums produced by Martin Kierszenbaum
Albums produced by Lady Gaga
Albums produced by RedOne
Brit Award for International Album
Cherrytree Records albums
Concept albums
Grammy Award for Best Dance/Electronica Album
Interscope Geffen A&M Records albums
Interscope Records albums